Onan was a figure detailed in the Book of Genesis chapter 38,  as the second son of Judah who married the daughter of Shuah the Canaanite. Onan had an older brother Er and a younger brother, Shelah as well. After being commanded by his father, Judah, to procreate with the late Er's wife Tamar, Onan instead "spilled his seed on the ground whenever he went in" because "the offspring would not be his", and was thus put to death by Yahweh. This act is detailed as retribution for being "displeasing in the sight of Lord".

The story of Onan has varying interpretations, being viewed as a cautionary tale against coitus interruptus and masturbation. Other analysts claim he was killed for refusing his father's command to continue the tribe's lineage.

Biblical account
New International Version

8 Then Judah said to Onan, “Go in to your brother’s wife and perform the duty of a brother-in-law to her; raise up offspring for your brother.” 

9 But since Onan knew that the offspring would not be his, he spilled his semen on the ground whenever he went in to his brother’s wife, so that he would not give offspring to his brother. 

10 What he did was displeasing in the sight of the Lord, and he put him to death also. 

English Standard Version

8 Then Judah said to Onan, “Go in to your brother’s wife and perform the duty of a brother-in-law to her, and raise up offspring for your brother.”

9 But Onan knew that the offspring would not be his. So whenever he went in to his brother’s wife he would waste the semen on the ground, so as not to give offspring to his brother.

10 And what he did was wicked in the sight of the LORD, and he put him to death also.

New American Standard Bible

8 Then Judah said to Onan, “Have relations with your brother’s wife and perform your duty as a brother-in-law to her, and raise up a child for your brother.”

9 Now Onan knew that the child would not be his; so when he had relations with his brother’s wife, he wasted his seed on the ground so that he would not give a child to his brother.

10 But what he did was displeasing in the sight of the Lord; so He took his life also.

New Revised Standard Version Updated Edition

8 Then Judah said to Onan, “Go in to your brother’s wife and perform the duty of a brother-in-law to her; raise up offspring for your brother.”

9 But since Onan knew that the offspring would not be his, he spilled his semen on the ground whenever he went in to his brother’s wife, so that he would not give offspring to his brother.

10 What he did was displeasing in the sight of the Lord, and he put him to death also.

The New Oxford Annotated Bible with Apocrypha: New Revised Standard Version 5th Edition

8 Then Judah said to Onan, “Go in to your brother’s wife and perform the duty of a brother-in-law to her; raise up offspring for your brother.”

9 But since Onan knew that the offspring would not be his, he spilled his semen on the ground whenever he went in to his brother’s wife, so that he would not give offspring to his brother.

10 What he did was displeasing in the sight of the Lord, and he put him to death also.

The Jewish Study Bible: Second Edition 2nd Edition

8 Then Judah said to Onan, "Join with your brother's wife and do your duty by her as a brother-in-law: and provide offspring for your brother."

9 But Onan, knowing that the seed would not count as his, let it go to waste whenever he joined with his brother's wife, so as not to provide offspring for his brother.

10 What he did was displeasing to the Lord, and He took his life also. 

After Yahweh slew Onan's oldest brother Er, Onan's father Judah told him to fulfill his duty as a brother-in-law to his brother Er by entering into a levirate marriage with his brother's widow Tamar to give her offspring. Religion professor Tikva Frymer-Kensky has pointed out the economic repercussions of a levirate marriage:  any son born to Tamar would be deemed the heir of the deceased Er and could claim the firstborn's double share of an inheritance. However, if Er were childless or only had daughters, Onan would have inherited as the oldest surviving son.

When Onan had sex with Tamar, he withdrew before he ejaculated and "spilled his seed on the ground" thus committing coitus interuptus, since any child born would not legally be considered his heir. The next statement in the Bible says that Onan displeased Yahweh, so the Lord slew him. Onan's crime is often misinterpreted to be masturbation but it is universally agreed among biblical scholars that Onan's death is attributed to his refusal to fulfill his obligation of levirate marriage with Tamar by committing coitus interruptus.

However, Onan‘s reluctance to give a child to his sister-in-law may reflect a rejection of this custom already present in society. The regulation of levirate marriage in Deut 25:5–10 shows that the custom had encountered some opposition. The law in Deuteronomy allowing a man to refuse his duty was a concession to the reluctance to comply with the custom. Because of Onan's unwillingness to bear a child for his deceased brother, Yahweh was displeased with Onan and slew him also (Gen 38:10).

Family tree

Interpretation
The implication from the narrative is that Onan's act as described is what gave rise to divine displeasure.

Early Jewish views
One opinion expressed in the Talmud argues that this was where the death penalty's imposition originated. Talmud also likens emitting semen in vain to shedding blood.

However, the regulations concerning ejaculation in the book of Leviticus, whether as a result of sexual intercourse or not, merely prescribe a ritual washing and becoming ritually impure until the following evening.

Classical Christian views
Early Christian writers have sometimes focused on the spilling seed, and the sexual act being used for non-procreational purposes. This interpretation was held by several early Christian apologists. Jerome, for example, argued:

Epiphanius of Salamis wrote against heretics who used coitus interruptus, calling it the sin of Οnan:<ref>United States Congress Senate Committee on Government Operations Subcommittee on Foreign Aid Expenditures. Population Crisis: Hearings, Eighty-ninth Congress, Second Session. U.S. Government Printing Office, 1966, p. 403–404</ref>

Clement of Alexandria, while not making explicit reference to Onan, similarly reflects an early Christian view of the abhorrence of spilling seed:

Roman Catholic views

The papal encyclical Casti connubii (1930) invokes this Biblical text in support of the teaching of the Catholic Church against contracepted sex by quoting St. Augustine, "Intercourse even with one's legitimate wife is unlawful and wicked where the conception of the offspring is prevented. Onan, the son of Juda, did this and the Lord killed him for it."

Early Protestant views
Making reference to Onan's offense to identify masturbation as sinful, in his Commentary on Genesis, John Calvin wrote that "the voluntary spilling of semen outside of intercourse between a man and a woman is a monstrous thing. Deliberately to withdraw from coitus in order that semen may fall on the ground is double monstrous."

Methodism founder John Wesley, according to Bryan C. Hodge, "believed that any waste of the semen in an unproductive sexual act, whether that should be in the form of masturbation or coitus interruptus, as in the case of Onan, destroyed the souls of the individuals who practice it". He writes his Thoughts on the Sin of Onan (1767), which was reproduced as A Word to Whom it May Concern on 1779, as an attempt to censor a work by Samuel-Auguste Tissot. In that writing, Wesley warns about "the dangers of self pollution", the bad physical and mental effects of masturbation, writes many such cases along with the treatment recommendations.

Disputes
According to some Bible critics who contextually read this passage, the description of Onan is an origin myth concerning fluctuations in the constituency of the tribe of Judah, with the death of Onan reflecting the dying out of a clan;Cheyne and Black, Encyclopedia Biblica Er and Onan are hence viewed as each being representative of a clan, with Onan possibly representing an Edomite clan named Onam, mentioned by an Edomite genealogy in Genesis.

Biblical scholars universally agree that the biblical story of Onan is not about masturbation nor about contraception per se or the "wasting of semen" but his refusal to fulfill his obligation of levirate-marriage with Tamar by committing coitus interruptus.

The text emphasizes the social and legal situation, with Judah explaining what Onan must do and why. A plain reading of the text is that Onan was killed because he refused to follow instructions. Scholars have argued that the secondary purpose of the narrative about Onan and Tamar, of which the description of Onan is a part, was to either assert the institution of levirate marriage or present a myth for its origin; Onan's role in the narrative is, thus, as the brother abusing his obligations by agreeing to sexual intercourse with his dead brother's wife, but refusing to allow her to become pregnant as a result. Emerton regards the evidence for this to be inconclusive, although classical rabbinical writers argued that this narrative describes the origin of levirate marriage.

John M. Riddle argues that "Epiphanius (fourth century) construed the sin of Onan as coitus interruptus". John T. Noonan Jr. says that "St. Epiphanius gave a plain interpretation of the text as a condemnation of contraception, and he did so only in the context of his anti-Gnostic polemic".

Bible scholars maintained that the story does not refer to masturbation, but to coitus interruptus.  Bible scholars even maintain that the Bible does not claim that masturbation would be sinful.

Although the story of Onan does not involve masturbation, according to Peter Lewis Allen, some theologians found "a common element" in both coitus interruptus (also known as onanism) and masturbation, as well as anal intercourse and other forms of nonmarital and nonvaginal sexual acts, which are considered wrongful acts.

Onanism
The term onanism has come to refer to "masturbation" in many modern languages – for example Hebrew (אוננות, onanút), German (Onanie), Greek (αυνανισμός, avnanismós), Japanese (オナニー, onanī), and Swedish (onani) – based on an interpretation of the Onan story.

The word onanism is not based on the biblical story of Onan itself but on an interpretation of that biblical story, nor is the word onanism found in any form in the biblical texts. Thus the etymological connection of onanism (in the sense of masturbation) with Onan’s name is misleading.

The Merriam-Webster'' online dictionary defines onanism as:
masturbation 
coitus interruptus
self-abuse.

Notes

References

Book of Genesis people
Masturbation
Onanism
Sexuality in the Bible
Tribe of Judah